The Massachusetts Department of Mental Health is a state agency of Massachusetts, providing mental health services. Its headquarters are at the Boston Government Service Center in Downtown Boston.

References

External links
 Massachusetts Department of Mental Health

State agencies of Massachusetts
State departments of health of the United States
Medical and health organizations based in Massachusetts